The Surrey Premier County Football League is a regional English football league for teams in South-West London, Surrey and neighbouring areas. It was founded in 2008. The league is at the 11th level of the English football league system and was incorporated into the National League System as a Step 7 league by the Football Association in June 2012. It has a division for first teams and a reserve division.

The league was formed to bridge the gap between local intermediate leagues and the lower division of the Combined Counties League.
The league is fed by the Surrey County Intermediate League (Western) and the Surrey South Eastern Combination. Teams from other local leagues, such as the Aldershot & District League, may also apply for membership.

2022–23 teams
AFC Cubo
AFC Royal Holloway
AFC Walcountians
Battersea Ironsides
Farleigh Rovers
Guildford United
Hersham
Horsley
Lyne
Ripley Village
Staines & Lammas
Wimbledon Casuals
Worcester Park

List of champions

Notes and references
Notes

References

External links
Football Mitoo page

 
Football in Surrey
Football leagues in England
Sports leagues established in 2008
2008 establishments in England